Langsdorfia pallida is a moth in the family Cossidae first described by Herbert Druce in 1911. It is found in Chile.

References

Hypoptinae
Endemic fauna of Chile